Shabab (also Romanized as Shabāb; also known as Shahrak-e Shabāb) is a city in Shabab District of Chardavol County, Ilam Province, Iran. At the 2006 census, its population was 3,363, in 693 families.  The city was upgraded from a village and was chosen to be the capital city of Shabab District which was established on June 30, 2013, on the same date. The city is populated by Kurds.

References 

Populated places in Chardavol County
Kurdish settlements in Ilam Province